William Boyle (born 1978) is an American author of character-driven literary crime fiction. Boyle is a native of Brooklyn, New York and the borough forms the backdrop for much of his work.

Reception 
When Boyle's debut novel, Gravesend, was reissued, the longtime crime fiction reviewer of the New York Times, Marilyn Stasio, noted Boyle's use of local dialect. A U.K. review from The Guardian also cited the book's idiomatic dialogue and blue-collar setting, drawing a parallel with Elmore Leonard.

In its review of The Lonely Witness, Publishers Weekly noted the gritty realism of Boyle's Brooklyn milieu.

New Orleans Review examined the variety of themes that inform Boyle's approach to crime fiction in its discussion of his short-story collection, Death Don't Have No Mercy. In another look at that anthology, the Clarion-Ledger, a leading newspaper in Boyle's adopted home state of Mississippi, touched on the commonality of Boyle's work with Southern forebears Flannery O'Connor and William Gay.

France's oldest daily newspaper, Le Figaro, compared Boyle to Dennis Lehane and George Pelecanos, among others. Gravesend was nominated among foreign authors for France's Grand Prix de Littérature Policière in 2016. In addition, it was one of five finalists in the novel category for the Prix SNCF du Polar. The French news weekly L'Express also cited it as one of the 10 best crime novels of that year.

The U.K. has also recognized Gravesend. It was shortlisted for the John Creasey CWA New Blood Dagger in 2018.

Boyle's reputation has been growing in his homeland as well. The Lonely Witness was singled out by the New York Post in June 2018. George Pelecanos name-checked The Lonely Witness a couple of months later in the New York Times, followed shortly by Stasio's review of Gravesend.

Stasio also had praise for Boyle's 2019 comic crime caper, A Friend Is a Gift You Give Yourself, upon its release in March 2019. On the cover of the U.K. edition, Roddy Doyle singled out the strength and humor of the female characters.

Boyle's 2020 novel City of Margins -- set almost entirely in South Brooklyn -- drew plaudits from Stasio once again. She focused on his character studies, which featured "a mixture of affection and despair worthy of a Bruce Springsteen song."

Boyle's latest novel is Shoot the Moonlight Out (2021), which drew its title from a Garland Jeffreys song. Once again, the action takes place almost entirely in South Brooklyn. The Washington Post noted that Boyle "tries to write about how bad people can do good things and good people can do bad things. In Shoot the Moonlight Out, Boyle achieves his aim marvelously."

Bibliography 
Boyle is the author of the following novels:

 Gravesend (originally published in 2013, French-language edition published in 2016, reissued in the U.S. in 2018): 
 Tout Est Brisé, or Everything Is Broken (2017; released only in French to date): 
 The Lonely Witness (2018): 
 A Friend Is a Gift You Give Yourself (2019): 
 City of Margins (2020): 
 Shoot the Moonlight Out (2021): 

He has also written a short story collection:

 Death Don’t Have No Mercy (2015):

References

External links
Biography at Mississippi Writers and Musicians site

Living people
1978 births
Date of birth missing (living people)
Writers from Brooklyn
Novelists from New York (state)
American crime fiction writers
21st-century American novelists
21st-century American short story writers